The  is an electric multiple unit (EMU) train type operated by the private railway operator Choshi Electric Railway in Chiba Prefecture, Japan, since March 2016. The sole two-car set was converted from former Iyotetsu 700 series EMU cars, which were themselves converted from former Keio 5000 series EMU cars, and was introduced to replace the Choshi Electric Railway's 1000 series EMU car number 1001, which was withdrawn in February 2016.

Formation
The two-car set is formed as shown below, with one motored ("DeHa") car and one non-powered trailer ("KuHa") car, and the DeHa 3000 car at the Choshi (i.e. northern) end.

External livery
Following conversion, the train was repainted into a livery consisting of light blue upper body and dark blue lower body separated by a thin white stripe. This livery was based on that applied to the line's former Yu 101 open-sided special-event car nicknamed Miotsukushi.

History
The two cars were built in 1963 for Keio Corporation in Tokyo, and resold to the Iyo Railway in Ehime Prefecture in 1988. They were withdrawn from service by the Iyo Railway in June 2015.

The two cars (713 and 763) were purchased from the Iyo Railway at a cost of 1.3 million yen, and shipped to Choshi, arriving at Choshi Port on 15 September 2015. Shipping and conversion work cost an estimated 75 million yen, funded partially by grants from the national government, Chiba Prefecture, and the city of Choshi.

Individual car histories

The train entered service on 26 March 2016.

References

External links

 Choshi Electric Railway rolling stock details 

Electric multiple units of Japan
Train-related introductions in 2016

ja:銚子電気鉄道線#車両
600 V DC multiple units